Yue Minjun (born 1962) is a contemporary Chinese artist based in Beijing, China. He is best known for oil paintings depicting himself in various settings, frozen in laughter. He has also reproduced this signature image in sculpture, watercolour and prints. While Yue is often classified as part of the Chinese Cynical Realist art movement developed in 1989, Yue rejects this label, but also "doesn't concern himself about what people call him."

Early life
Yue was born in 1962 in Daqing, Heilongjiang, China. His family worked on an oil field, and he also taught art in oil school for a short time. In 1980, he graduated from high school, went to Tian Jing National Company. In 1983, he decided to go to He Pei and became an electrician. He was painting and working at the same time, and he could normally paint and work non-stop for 20 days. This life experience could indicate why he paints skin in red. In the 1980s, he started painting portraits of his co-workers and the sea while he was engaged in deep-sea oil drilling. In 1989, he was inspired by a painting by Geng Jianyi at an art show in Beijing, which depicted Geng's own laughing face. In 1990, he eventually moved to Hongmiao in the Chaoyang District, Beijing, which was also home to many other Chinese artists. During this period, his style of art developed out of portraits of his bohemian friends from the artists' village. It is important to note that Yue lived a "nomadic" existence for much of his life, because his family often moved in order to find work on various oil fields. Labeled by critics as a very influential member of the Cynical Realism movement, he found success and praise for his signature images in a variety of including sculpture, water color, and print. The whole country was experiencing the complexities of modernity and postmodernity, breaking down old thoughts and doing something new, very much reflected in the Chinese modern art revolution. This was crucially important for Yue. He has said he grew up in very a closed world, where military families gave him a protected feeling, but everything happening during this period totally changed his relationship to the world.

Career

Yue Minjun's style can be traced back to the work of Geng Jianyi, who first inspired Yue with his work of his own laughing face. Over the years, Yue Minjun's style has also rapidly developed. He often challenges social and cultural conventions by depicting objects and even political issues in a radical and abstract manner. He has also shifted his focus from the technical aspects to the "whole concept of creation". 'Massacre of Chios', one of his most known works, shares its name with a painting of the same name, by Eugène Delacroix, depicting the 1822 event in Greek history. As of 2007 thirteen of his paintings had sold for over a million dollars. One of his most popular series was his "Hat" collection. This series, pictures Yue's grinning head wearing a variety of hats—a chef's hat, a Special Forces beret, the helmet of a British policeman, Catwoman's mask, and so on. The artist tells us that the series is about a "sense of the absurdity of the ideas that govern the sociopolitical protocol surrounding hats." The series nicely illustrates the way that Yue's character is universally adaptable, a sort of logo that can be attached to any setting to add value. When asked to participate in the Venice Biennale in 1999, Yue opted to begin fabricating bronze sculptural versions of his signature self-portrait paintings, playing off China's famous Qin Dynasty army of terracotta warriors. While the ancient sculptures are known for the subtle individuality of each of the warriors, his cackling modern-day version are relentlessly identical, cast from the same mold. In Noah's Ark, six of Yue's self-portraits sit in a small rowboat on a blue sea, squatting together, gripping their knees and screaming in silent laughter. In Solar System, three identical Yues are cackling at the bottom of the canvas, each clad only in underwear, giant planets wheeling behind them in outer space.

Cynical Realism 
In the mid-1990s, the "godfather" of Chinese contemporary art, Li Xianting, labeled Yue Minjun with Cynical Realism. Cynical Realism described the status of living with a cynical and ridiculing art attitude, using self-opinion to understand the political and commercial. "Yue’s pieces are mocking himself and the community, free himself and vent his emotions." Art critics have often associated Yue with the Cynical Realism art movement in contemporary Chinese art. Yue is currently residing with fifty other Chinese artists in the Songzhuang Village.

Art Market 
Since his debut, the work of Yue Minjun has been featured in numerous galleries in Singapore, Hong Kong and Beijing. His piece Execution became the most expensive work ever by a Chinese contemporary artist, when sold in 2007 for £2.9 million pounds (US $5.9 million) at London's Sotheby's. Until its sale at Sotheby's Hong Kong in 2007, this painting had been owned by Trevor Simon, a junior investment banker who bought it with about a third of his salary while working in the region. Simon kept this painting in storage for 10 years as required by the conditions of sale. The record sale took place week after his painting Massacre of Chios sold at the Hong Kong Sotheby's for nearly $4.1 million.

Exhibitions 

Kunsthalle Mannheim under director Rolf Lauter already integrated works by Yue Minjun, Fang Lijun and Yang Shaobin in his first new presentations 2003/2004 of the new collection. The constellations with 19th century portraits  - Maillol and Rodin - as well as works by Jeff Wall and Alex Katz found a critical and broad response in Germany at the time.

Yue Minjun’s first museum show in the United States took place at the Queens Museum of Art, Queens, New York.  The show, Yue Minjun and the Symbolic Smile, featured bronze and polychrome sculptures, paintings and drawings and ran from October 2007 to January 2008.

The first major exhibition in Europe dedicated to the artist from November 14, 2012 to March 17, 2013.
The Fondation Cartier pour l'Art Contemporain presented the first major European exhibition dedicated to the Chinese artist Yue Minjun, a unique opportunity to discover the work of an artist who, in spite of his international renown, continues to maintain a relatively low profile.

Shows

2012 YIRONGLIANGJIANG, Yang Zi modern Art Center, Chong Qing, China

2011 Yue Minjun: Road, Peisi, Beijing, China

2009 Archaeological discoveries of the year 2009, Daily Museum, Beijing, China

2007 Yue Minjun: Iconic Smile, Queens Museum of Art, NY, U.S.A.

2006 Rework Series, Enrico Navarra gallery, France

2004 Sculpture and Painting Exhibition, Shao Li Gallery, Hong Kong

2004 The Dream of Dragon, Ireland Modern Art Museum

2004 Shanghai Art Show 2004, Shanghai, China

2004 Guangzhou Art Show 2004, China

2004 Dune Sculpture, Enrico Navarra gallery, France

2004 Han Yaxuan 20th Anniversary Show, Hong Kong Art Center

2004 Figure-China, Marseille Contemporary Art Museum, France

2003-2004 The New Kunsthalle: natural - physical - sensual. Kunsthalle Mannheim, Germany

2003 Arts From China, Edwin Gallery & National Gallery in Jakarta, Indonesia

2003 Yue Minjun, Meile Gallery, Switzerland

2003 Irony in Beijing, Prüss & Ochs gallery, Berlin, Germany

2002 Bath in The Giggle, Soobin, Singapore

2002 Rework, Shi Fang Art Center, China

2000 The Red Sea, Chinese contemporary art gallery in London, UK

Public collections
CP Art Foundation, Indonesia

Cheng Du Shang He Museum, China

hen Yang Dong Yu Art Museum, China

Guang Dong Art Museum, China

Shen Zhen Art Museum, China

Museum of Modern Art, San Francisco, America

Museum of Architecture, Chicago, America

Denver Art Museum, America

Francois. Mitterrand Cultural Center, France

Busan Museum of Art, Korea

Arario Galleries, Korea

Union University Art Museum, Singapore

See also
 A-maze-ing Laughter

References

External links

Yue Minjun at 88MoCCA - The Museum of Chinese contemporary art on the web
Yue Minjun - Sgustok Magazine
gallery of yue minjun
Yue Minjun on Widewalls
Yue Minjun at Louis Lannoo Gallery
Interview With Yue Minjun - Elena Cué - Huffington Post

1962 births
Living people
Chinese contemporary artists
People from Daqing
Painters from Heilongjiang